The 1922 College Basketball All-Southern Team consisted of basketball players from the South chosen at their respective positions.

All-Southerns

Guards
George Harmon, Mercer (C, GB, MB, MT, MN)
Monk McDonald, North Carolina (C, GB, MB, MT [as f], MN)
Tom Ryan, Vanderbilt (MT, MN)
Billy Carmichael, North Carolina (MT)

Forwards
Charles Wallett, Newberry (C, GB)
Baby Roane, Georgia Tech (GB [as g], MB)
Consuello Smith, Mercer (MT, MN)
Paul Adkins, Kentucky (GB)
Sidney Perry, North Carolina (MN)

Center
Bill Redd, Chattanooga (C, GB, MB, MT, MN)
Cartwright Carmichael, North Carolina (C, GB [as f], MB [as f], MT [as f], MN [as f])
Robert Gamble, Mercer (GB, MT, MN)

Key
C = the composite pick of sportswriters at the SIAA tournament.

GB = selected by Guy Butler of the Atlanta Georgian.

MB = selected by Morgan Blake in the Atlanta Journal.

MT = selected by the Macon Telegraph.

MN = selected by the Macon News.

References

All-Southern